Strandfontein is a coastal village in the Matzikama Municipality, in the Western Cape province of South Africa. According to the 2011 census it has 431 residents in 92 households. The name is Afrikaans for "beach spring".

References

Populated places in the Matzikama Local Municipality